St Reims (foaled 9 November 1999 in New Zealand) is a thoroughbred racehorse who won the New Zealand Derby in 2002.

A million-dollar yearling, big things were always expected of the son of Zabeel, and although he didn't break his maiden until his fifth start he soon started to live up to expectations. A runaway win in the Avondale Guineas at his last start before the Derby ensured that he would start favourite in the Classic, and he didn't disappoint. Given an excellent ride out in front by Greg Childs, the colt was never headed and scored a narrow but authoritative win.

After the Derby his career went downhill. After disappointing performances in an autumn Sydney campaign, St Reims failed to win a single race as a four-year-old and looked to be a shadow of his former self. But at Hastings in the spring of 2004 he regained his interest in racing and put together a string of wins against horses the quality of Waitoki Dream and Zafar, culminating in a return to Group race success in the Lindauer Grandeur Stakes at Ellerslie, the scene of his Derby triumph.

He followed that win up with the Group 2 Counties Cup, a desperately close second under a demanding weight in the Group 2 Waikato Cup and a well-deserved second Group 1 victory in the 2005 Zabeel Classic at Ellerslie beating Distinctly Secret and Lashed.

Following another Group 1 placing behind Xcellent in the Darley Stakes and a seventh behind the same horse in the Kelt Capital Stakes, he was retired to stand at Stoney Bridge Stud.

Stud career

St Reims had his first winner as a sire when two-year-old filly St J'adore, from his first crop, won a maiden race at Avondale on 7 May 2010.

His progeny included:

 Bad Boy Brown, winner of the 2019 Great Northern Hurdles.
 Tallyho Twinkletoe, winner of the 2015 Grand National Hurdles (4250m), the 2021 Grand National Steeplechase (5600m), 2021 Koral Steeplechase (4250m) and multiple prestige steeplechases in Australia.

References

1999 racehorse births
Thoroughbred family 9-f
Racehorses bred in New Zealand
Racehorses trained in New Zealand